Hanover Township is a township in Crawford County, Iowa, USA.  As of the 2000 census, its population was 226.

Geography
According to the USGS, it contains one cemetery, Bockelmann Family.

References
 USGS Geographic Names Information System (GNIS)

External links
 US-Counties.com
 City-Data.com

Townships in Crawford County, Iowa
Townships in Iowa